This is a list of flags used by North Korea.

National

Political

Military

See also
List of Korean flags

References

Further reading

External links
North Korea at Flags of the World

North Korean
Flags
Flags
List